Trimountain is an unincorporated community and census-designated place (CDP) in the northern part of Adams Township, Houghton County, Michigan, United States. It is along highway M-26 between South Range to the northeast and Painesdale to the southwest.

Trimountain was first listed as a CDP prior to the 2020 census.

Demographics

References 

Census-designated places in Houghton County, Michigan
Census-designated places in Michigan
Unincorporated communities in Michigan
Unincorporated communities in Houghton County, Michigan